Chief McIntosh Lake is a reservoir in the U.S. state of Georgia.

Chief McIntosh Lake was named after William McIntosh (1775–1825), a Creek Nation chief.

References

Reservoirs in Georgia (U.S. state)
Bodies of water of Butts County, Georgia